Juan Orlando Hernández Alvarado (born 28 October 1968), also known as JOH, is a Honduran lawyer and politician who served as President of Honduras from 2014 to 2022 for two consecutive terms. He is the brother of convicted drug trafficker Tony Hernández.

A member of the National Party, Hernández previously served as the president of the National Congress of Honduras between January 2010 and June 2013, when he was given permission by the Congress to absent himself from all responsibilities in the Congress to dedicate himself to his presidential campaign. He announced that he would seek re-election in 2017, after the Supreme Court allowed it in April 2015. On 15 December 2016, the Supreme Electoral Tribunal decided, by two votes to one, to allow Hernández to stand in the primary elections by the National Party of Honduras on 12 March 2017. On 12 March 2017, he won the National Party's primary vote to allow him to represent his party during the 2017 Honduran general election on 26 November 2017. In the elections, Hernández was declared the winner by a narrow margin (0.5%), after a reelection campaign criticized as fraudulent by OAS, while the United States recognized Hernández as the official winner. The same day he ceased to be president, he was sworn as a member of the Central American Parliament.

On 7 February 2022, Hernández had his visa revoked by the U.S. Department of State, due to involvements in corruption and in the illegal drug trade. On 14 February, he was surrounded by the National police and DEA agents at his residency to process his capture and eventually take him to custody of the United States for possible trials. The U.S. government also requested an extradition against him for his involvement with narcotics. After an extradition warrant was issued, he decided to surrender to US authorities on 15 February 2022. The same day, local police arrested Hernández at his home in Tegucigalpa. On 21 April, Hernández was extradited to the United States.

Early life and career 

Hernández was born in Gracias, Honduras to Juan Hernández Villanueva and Elvira Alvarado Castillo, as the fifteenth of seventeen children. His siblings include Hilda Hernández (1966–2017) and Juan Antonio (Tony) Hernández, a former deputy now in U.S. federal custody on drug trafficking charges. He has a master's degree in public administration from the State University of New York at Albany. On 3 February 1990, he married Ana García Carías. This union has produced three children: Juan Orlando, Ana Daniela, and Isabela. He was a coffee-growing campesino in his native Gracias.

Juan Orlando Hernández, who represented Lempira Department since 2001, was elected President of the National Congress where the National Party had a comfortable majority, on 21 January 2010, and took office four days later.

Presidential campaigns 
In 2012, he fought a campaign against Ricardo Álvarez to try to become the National Party presidential candidate for 2013, and won the internal election of November 2012; Álvarez publicly denounced the result as fraudulent and demanded a "vote by vote" recount, which the Tribunal Supremo Electoral (TSE) rejected.

A poll conducted in May 2013 saw him in third place with a projected 18% of the vote. He began his presidential campaign in July 2013 in Intibucá and La Paz with a campaign entitled El Pueblo Propone (The People Propose in English). He campaigned for the military to police the streets, and claimed that his closest rival Xiomara Castro wanted to remove the Policía Militar (English: Military Police) which were already in Honduras' two main cities. He won the election, beating Castro by 250,000 votes.

Hernández said National Party accountants found that approximately L3 million lempira (about US$140,000) from companies with links to the Honduran Social Security Institute (IHSS) scandal had entered its campaign coffers.

On 22 April 2015, the Supreme Court unanimously allowed presidential re-election. On 12 March 2017, Hernández became the National Party candidate by defeating his rival Roberto Castillo during the National Party primary. The Honduran Constitution allows revocation of citizenship of anyone who promotes changing the law to allow re-election, however Hernández's National Party, which also controls Congress, says a Supreme Court ruling last year allows him to stand for a new term. Opposition Liberal Party claims that the court does not have the power to make such decisions.

The President was re-elected in the 2017 presidential election after a vote deemed fraudulent by the opposition and international observers. The government declared a state of emergency. Some 30 demonstrators were killed and more than 800 arrested. According to the United Nations and the Inter-American Commission on Human Rights, "many of them were transferred to military installations, where they were brutally beaten, insulted and sometimes tortured".

Presidency (2014–2022)

Protests
Hondurans both in and outside Honduras have protested against corruption in Honduras, allegedly by Hernández government as well as the judiciary, the military, the police and other public administration entities, demanding an end to what they say is the theft of funds and public money; for example, the embezzlement of the IHSS. In May 2015, Radio Globo discovered documents that allegedly showed that the Honduran National Party had received large amounts of cash from nonexistent companies through fraudulent contracts awarded by the IHSS when it was run by Mario Zelaya. The contracts were approved by the National Congress of Honduras when Hernández was its president and the party funding committee was headed by his sister, Hilda Hernández. Hernández has accepted that his election campaign received money from companies tied to the scandal, but denies any personal knowledge. By June 2015, Hernández had appointed a commission to investigate the cause of the corruption.

In 2017, the Drug Enforcement Agency in Miami arrested Hernández's brother, Juan Antonio Hernández, for drug trafficking and for using Honduran military personnel and equipment to ship cocaine to the United States on behalf of the Mexican Sinaloa Cartel.

On 21 June 2018, president Hernández ordered units of the Honduran army and the military police in the streets of the capital after renewed protests. According to a Hospital Escuela Universitario spokesperson, at least 17 people suffered bullet wounds as a result of violence in the protests, and two of them died at the hospital.

In April 2019, new anti-privatisation and anti-corruption protests erupted, led by Tegucigalpa Autonomous University students and by health care workers. Tear gas was used against the protesters in demonstrations that took place in the center of Tegucigalpa.

Rosenthal family and Tony Hernández cases of drug trafficking 
On 7 October 2015, the United States Department of Justice released a statement saying that Jaime Rosenthal, his son Yani Rosenthal and nephew Yankel Rosenthal, as well as seven other businesses, were labeled "specially designated narcotics traffickers" under the Foreign Narcotics Kingpin Designation Act, the first time this had been used against a bank outside the United States. As a result, the Honduran National Commission for Banks and Insurance (Comisión Nacional de Banca y Seguros, CNBS), forcibly liquidated the Banco Continental, property of the Rosenthal family, which was closed as of Monday, 12 October 2015, as well as other businesses and properties allegedly involved in money laundering. Hernández said that the financial system "is solid" and made it clear that this "is a problem between Banco Continental and the USA justice system".

President Hernández's brother, Antonio "Tony" Hernández, was convicted in the USA on drug trafficking charges and sentenced to life imprisonment. After Tony Hernández's conviction on 18 October 2019, 7,000 supporters of President Hernández, including members of the official National Party of Honduras, marched in Tegucigalpa. President Hernández criticized his brother's conviction as basado en testimonios de asesinos ("based on testimony from killers") and denied that Honduras has become a narco-state.

Religious conservatism
The presidency of Hernández was marked by an increase in the influence of conservative evangelical organizations and Opus Dei on government decisions. Compulsory prayer at the beginning of the day was instituted in schools and in certain institutions such as the police and the army. At the beginning of 2021, the total prohibition of abortion and same-sex marriage was included in the Constitution, making it very difficult to change the law later on.

Fake Facebook supporters
From June to July 2018, 78% of Hernández's Facebook posts received likes were not real people, artificially boosting Hernández' apparent popular support by a factor of 5. The Social Manager of Hernandez's official Pages of both Hernández and his late sister, who had served as communications minister, was directly controlling several hundreds of these fake entities. This campaign innovated by using Facebook's Organization Pages, configured with human names and photos, to add apparent support and to lure unaware readers.

Foreign policy
Hernández approached to the United States by having good relations with both the Obama, and the Trump administrations. Hernández was seen as a key ally in Central America given the presence of Daniel Ortega in Nicaragua.

In 2019, during the Venezuelan presidential crisis, Hernández recognized the legitimacy of Juan Guaidó as president of Venezuela and joined the declarations of the Lima Group, against the Maduro government. In the same way, Hernández became close to the pronunciations of the Organization of American States (OAS), regarding the crisis in Venezuela.

In 2021, Hernández travelled to Israel, where he met with prime minister Naftali Bennett, and where he inaugurated Honduras's embassy in Jerusalem, becoming one of the countries which officially recognize Jerusalem as capital of Israel.

Shortly before leaving office, in October 2021, contrary to his alliance with the US, Hernández met Nicaragua's Ortega in Managua, where they signed agreements regarding disputes in the Caribbean Sea and the Gulf of Fonseca, on which there had been a ruling by a The Hague court years earlier. The summit between Hernández and Ortega was described as "strange", "surprising", and "unusual" by El País, given the leaders' differences in the previous years.

US drug trafficking investigation, arrest, and extradition
At the end of May 2019 US prosecutors unsealed some 2015 documents which revealed that Hernández was himself the subject of a major drug trafficking and money laundering investigation, alongside his sister Hilda and others.

Hernández was identified as a co-conspirator in a drug trafficking and money laundering case against his brother, according to document filed in U.S. district court. Prosecutors say $1.5 million in drug proceeds was used to help elect him in 2013. Hernández responded saying he is foe of traffickers who are out for revenge against him.

A document released by a U.S. district court implicates Honduran President Juan Orlando Hernández in a conspiracy with his brother, Antonio "Tony" Hernández, and other high-level officials — including former President Porfirio Lobo Sosa — "to leverage drug trafficking to maintain and enhance their political power." Tony Hernández would be put on trial in the United States and receive a life sentence in January 2021 following his conviction of numerous charges related to his work in drug trafficking.

The 44-page document – which is related to the trial of Tony Hernández in New York's Southern District on drug trafficking and other charges – summarizes some of the key evidence collected by prosecutors against the defendant, who they accuse of being a “violent, multi-ton drug trafficker” who allegedly abused his political connections for personal and political gain and at least twice “helped arrange murders of drug trafficking rivals.”

On 7 February 2022, ex-president Hernández had his visa revoked by the U.S. Department of State, due to involvements in corruption and dealings with narcotics. On 14 February, he was surrounded by the National police and DEA agents at his residency to process his capture and eventually take him to custody of the United States for possible trials. The U.S. government also requested an extradition against him for his involvement with narcotics. After issuing an extradition warrant, Juan Orlando Hernández decided to surrender to US authorities on 15 February 2022. The same day, local Honduran authorities arrested Hernández at his home in Tegucigalpa.

During that time on 15 February the first audience of Juan Orlando Hernandez was timed with the Supreme Court of Honduras placing the judge Edwin Ortez in charge of the case of extradition. At a second proceeding on 16 March, Judge Ortez approved the order of extradition appealed by the Southern District of New York. Hernández's lawyers appealed Ortez's ruling, but on 28 March 2022, the Supreme Court of Honduras rejected his appeal and authorized his extradition to the United States.

On 21 April Hernández was extradited to the United States. The United States District Court for the Southern District of New York unsealed their indictment, charging him with conspiracy to import cocaine to the United States, as well as firearms charges (under ).

The United States specifically charges Hernández with accepting millions of dollars in bribes from narcotraffickers since 2004, and specifically the Sinaloa Cartel, led at the time by Joaquín "El Chapo" Guzmán since 2012. The indictment states that Tony Hernández collected the bribes using men armed with machine guns; in exchange, Juan Orlando Hernandez conspired to protect smugglers from investigation and arrest, specifically providing "access to law enforcement and military information, including data from flight radar in Honduras."

In a video statement posted on social media, Hernandez said he is innocent and that he had been set up by drug traffickers.

On 10 May 2022, Hernández pled not-guilty to all charges and complained about the conditions in which he is being held, with his lawyer describing those conditions as those of a "prisoner of war", and saying they were "psychologically debilitating".

Honors
Order of Brilliant Jade with Grand Cordon (Republic of China)

See also

References

External links

Biography by CIDOB (in Spanish)

 

1968 births
Living people
Deputies of the National Congress of Honduras
Honduran Roman Catholics
20th-century Honduran lawyers
National Party of Honduras politicians
People from Lempira Department
Presidents of Honduras
Presidents of the National Congress of Honduras
University at Albany, SUNY alumni
Universidad Nacional Autónoma de Honduras alumni
Heads of government who were later imprisoned
People extradited to the United States